Acuant is an identity verification, document authentication and fraud prevention technology services provider headquartered in Los Angeles, with engineering and development centers in New Hampshire and Israel.

Products include ID capture and auto-fill software, ID authentication, biometric facial recognition, facial image matching, and CHIP/RFID reading. The company's partners include start-ups, Fortune 500 and FTSE 350 organizations.

Acuant's applications address regulations such as  AML, KYC, and PII, and are in use by organizations in such industries as hospitality, healthcare, automotive, security, and financial services.

Company
Acuant was founded in 1999 in Los Angeles, California, by Danny and Iuval Hatzav, as Card Scanning Solutions, which was incorporated in 2003 and later rebranded in 2014 as Acuant. Yossi Zekri was named CEO & President in 2008.

In May 2016, Acuant acquired Assure-Tec Technologies, a provider of identity document authentication and data capture solutions.

In 2017, Acuant acquired Ozone® from Mount Airy Group.

In 2018, Audax Private Equity completed an investment in Acuant to support the continued growth initiatives of the company. Audax acquired a controlling interest in Acuant from Insight Venture Partners, Lightview Capital and Egis Capital Partners.

In 2020, Acuant announced the acquisition of the former strategic partner IdentityMind, creator of Trusted Digital Identities.

On November 18, 2021, UK-based GB Group announced it was acquiring Acuant for $736 million (£547 million).

See also 
 Multi-factor authentication
 Automatic identification and data capture

References

External links 
 

Companies based in Los Angeles
1999 establishments in California